Cantharellus concinnus is a species of fungus in the genus Cantharellus. It is found in Australia, where it fruits in groups or clusters on the ground in mixed forests of Casuarina and Eucalyptus.

References

External links
 

concinnus
Fungi described in 1878
Fungi of Australia
Edible fungi
Taxa named by Miles Joseph Berkeley